This list of birds of Connecticut is a comprehensive account of all the bird species recorded from the U.S. state of Connecticut. Unless otherwise noted, this list is based on the checklist produced by the Avian Records Committee of Connecticut (ARCC) dated March 14, 2022, the list used by most birders to track species recorded in the state.

This list includes all bird species known to have occurred in the state, including birds that don't breed in Connecticut, such as migrants, winter visitors and vagrants, as well as breeding species and recently extinct and extirpated species. There are about 280 species that are recorded consistently every year in the state. The Atlas of Breeding Birds of Connecticut (1994) listed 173 bird species as confirmed breeders, based on a 1982–1986 survey. An assessment before 2004 estimated the total number of species breeding regularly in the state at about 150.

Of the 451 species listed here, 307 are considered ordinary residents or migrants, expected to be encountered regularly if not necessarily annually. Nine were introduced to North America, three are extinct, four have had their local breeding populations extirpated (but two of these are still stocked for hunting), and 139 are considered rare or accidental. Twelve species are included though they have only sight records. 

This list is presented in the taxonomic sequence of the Check-list of North and Middle American Birds, 7th edition through the 62nd Supplement, published by the American Ornithological Society (AOS). Common and scientific names are also those of the Check-list, except that the common names of families are from the Clements taxonomy because the AOS list does not include them.

The following tags are used to designate some species:

 (R) Rare or accidental - birds that if observed require more comprehensive documentation than regularly seen species
 (I) Introduced - a species introduced to North America as a consequence, direct or indirect, of human actions
 (X) Extinct - a species that no longer exists
 (E) Extirpated - a species that no longer occurs in Connecticut although populations exist elsewhere
 (S) - Sight record only

Ducks, geese, and waterfowl
Order: AnseriformesFamily: Anatidae

The family Anatidae includes the ducks and most duck-like waterfowl, such as geese and swans. These birds are adapted to an aquatic existence with webbed feet, bills which are flattened to a greater or lesser extent, and feathers that are excellent at shedding water due to special oils. Forty-six species have been recorded in Connecticut.

Black-bellied whistling-duck, Dendrocygna autumnalis (R)
Fulvous whistling-duck, Dendrocygna bicolor (R)
Snow goose, Anser caerulescens
Ross's goose, Anser rossii (R)
Graylag goose, Anser anser (R)
Greater white-fronted goose, Anser albifrons
Pink-footed goose, Anser brachyrhynchus (R)
Brant, Branta bernicla
Barnacle goose, Branta leucopsis (R)
Cackling goose, Branta hutchinsii
Canada goose, Branta canadensis
Mute swan, Cygnus olor (I)
Trumpeter swan, Cygnus buccinator (R)
Tundra swan, Cygnus columbianus
Wood duck, Aix sponsa
Blue-winged teal, Spatula discors
Cinnamon teal, Spatula cyanoptera (R)
Northern shoveler, Spatula clypeata
Gadwall, Mareca strepera
Eurasian wigeon, Mareca penelope
American wigeon, Mareca americana
Mallard, Anas platyrhynchos
American black duck, Anas rubripes
Northern pintail, Anas acuta
Green-winged teal, Anas crecca
Canvasback, Aythya valisineria
Redhead, Aythya americana
Ring-necked duck, Aythya collaris
Tufted duck, Aythya fuligula (R)
Greater scaup, Aythya marila
Lesser scaup, Aythya affinis
King eider, Somateria spectabilis
Common eider, Somateria mollissima
Harlequin duck, Histrionicus histrionicus
Surf scoter, Melanitta perspicillata
White-winged scoter, Melanitta deglandi
Black scoter, Melanitta americana
Long-tailed duck, Clangula hyemalis
Bufflehead, Bucephala albeola
Labrador duck, Camptorhynchus labradorius (X)
Common goldeneye, Bucephala clangula
Barrow's goldeneye, Bucephala islandica
Hooded merganser, Lophodytes cucullatus
Common merganser, Mergus merganser
Red-breasted merganser, Mergus serrator
Ruddy duck, Oxyura jamaicensis

New World quail
Order: GalliformesFamily: Odontophoridae

The New World quails are small, plump terrestrial birds only distantly related to the quails of the Old World, but named for their similar appearance and habits. One species has been recorded in Connecticut.

Northern bobwhite, Colinus virginianus (E) — sporadic escapes of pen-raised birds (for dog training or hunting), but no self-sustaining breeding population

Pheasants, grouse, and allies

Order: GalliformesFamily: Phasianidae

Phasianidae consists of the pheasants and their allies. These are terrestrial species, variable in size but generally plump with broad relatively short wings. Many species are gamebirds or have been domesticated as a food source for humans. Turkeys have a distinctive fleshy wattle that hangs from the underside of the beak and a fleshy protuberance that hangs from the top of its beak called a snood. As with many galliform species, the female (the hen) is smaller and much less colorful than the male (the tom). With wingspans of 1.5–1.8 meters (almost 6 feet), the turkeys are the largest birds in the open forests in which they live and are rarely mistaken for any other species. Grouse inhabit temperate and subarctic regions of the Northern Hemisphere. They are game and are sometimes hunted for food. In all Connecticut species, males are polygamous and have elaborate courtship displays. These heavily built birds have legs feathered to the toes. Most species are year-round residents and do not migrate. Five species have been recorded in Connecticut.

Wild turkey, Meleagris gallopavo
Ruffed grouse, Bonasa umbellus
Greater prairie-chicken, Tympanuchus cupido (E)
Heath hen, T. c. cupido (X)
Gray partridge, Perdix perdix (I) (E)
Ring-necked pheasant, Phasianus colchicus (I) (E) — annual release for hunting, but no self-sustaining breeding population

Grebes

Order: PodicipediformesFamily: Podicipedidae

Grebes are small to medium-large freshwater diving birds. They have lobed toes and are excellent swimmers and divers. However, they have their feet placed far back on the body, making them quite ungainly on land. Five species have been recorded in Connecticut.

Pied-billed grebe, Podilymbus podiceps — a rare breeder found in freshwater marshes, marshy ponds, and lakes in the western part of the state; an uncommon spring and fall migrant and then found on coastal and inland waters
Horned grebe, Podiceps auritus — numerous spring and fall migrant, although not always; seen less in winter, usually along the coast and sometimes inland on large lakes and rivers
Red-necked grebe, Podiceps grisegena — uncommon in spring and fall migration season, rare in winter; usually found along the coast, sometimes on inland bodies of water
Eared grebe, Podiceps nigricollis (R)
Western grebe, Aechmorphorus occidentalis (R)

Pigeons and doves

Order: ColumbiformesFamily: Columbidae

Pigeons and doves are stout-bodied birds with short necks and short slender bills with a fleshy cere. Seven species have been recorded in Connecticut.

Rock pigeon, Columba livia (I)
Band-tailed pigeon, Patagioenas fasciata (R) (S)
Eurasian collared-dove, Streptopelia decaocto (I) (R)
Passenger pigeon, Ectopistes migratorius (X)
Common ground dove, Columbina passerina (R)
White-winged dove, Zenaida asiatica (R)
Mourning dove, Zenaida macroura

Cuckoos

Order: CuculiformesFamily: Cuculidae

The family Cuculidae includes cuckoos, roadrunners, and anis. These birds are of variable size with slender bodies, long tails, and strong legs. The Old World cuckoos are brood parasites. Two species have been recorded in Connecticut.

Yellow-billed cuckoo, Coccyzus americanus
Black-billed cuckoo, Coccyzus erythropthalmus

Nightjars and allies

Order: CaprimulgiformesFamily: Caprimulgidae

Nightjars are medium-sized nocturnal birds that usually nest on the ground. They have long wings, short legs and very short bills. Most have small feet which are of little use for walking and long, pointed wings. Their soft plumage is cryptically colored to resemble bark or leaves. Three species have been recorded in Connecticut.

Common nighthawk,  Chordeiles minor
Chuck-will's-widow, Antrostomus carolinensis (R)
Eastern whip-poor-will, Antrostomus vociferus

Swifts
Order: ApodiformesFamily: Apodidae

The swifts are small birds which spend the majority of their lives flying. These birds have very short legs and never settle voluntarily on the ground, perching instead only on vertical surfaces. Many swifts have long swept-back wings which resemble a crescent or boomerang. One species has been recorded in Connecticut.

Chimney swift, Chaetura pelagica

Hummingbirds

Order: ApodiformesFamily: Trochilidae

Hummingbirds are small birds capable of hovering in mid-air due to the rapid flapping of their wings. They are the only birds that can fly backwards. six species have been recorded in Connecticut.

Mexican violetear, Colibri thalassinus (R)
Ruby-throated hummingbird, Archilochus colubris
Black-chinned hummingbird, Archilochus alexandri  (R)
Calliope hummingbird, Selasphorus calliope (R)
Rufous hummingbird, Selasphorus rufus
Broad-billed hummingbird, Cynanthus latirostris (R)

Rails, gallinules, and coots

Order: GruiformesFamily: Rallidae

Rallidae is a large family of small to medium-sized birds which includes the rails, crakes, coots, and gallinules. The most typical family members occupy dense vegetation in damp environments near lakes, swamps, or rivers. In general they are shy and secretive birds, making them difficult to observe. Most species have strong legs and long toes which are well adapted to soft uneven surfaces. They tend to have short, rounded wings and to be weak fliers. Ten species have been recorded in Connecticut.

Clapper rail, Rallus crepitans
King rail, Rallus elegans
Virginia rail, Rallus limicola
Corn crake, Crex crex (R)
Sora, Porzana carolina
Common gallinule, Gallinula galeata
American coot, Fulica americana
Purple gallinule, Porphyrio martinicus (R)
Yellow rail, Coturnicops noveboracensis (R)
Black rail, Laterallus jamaicensis (R)

Cranes
Order: GruiformesFamily: Gruidae

Cranes are large, long-legged, and long-necked birds. Unlike the similar-looking but unrelated herons, cranes fly with necks outstretched, not pulled back. Most have elaborate and noisy courting displays or "dances". One species has been recorded in Connecticut.

Sandhill crane, Antigone canadensis

Stilts and avocets
Order: CharadriiformesFamily: Recurvirostridae

Recurvirostridae is a family of large wading birds, which includes the avocets and stilts. The avocets have long legs and long up-curved bills. The stilts have extremely long legs and long, thin, straight bills. Two species have been recorded in Connecticut.

Black-necked stilt, Himantopus mexicanus (R)
American avocet, Recurvirostra americana

Oystercatchers

Order: CharadriiformesFamily: Haematopodidae

The oystercatchers are large, obvious and noisy plover-like birds, with strong bills used for smashing or prying open molluscs. One species has been recorded in Connecticut.

American oystercatcher, Haematopus palliatus

Lapwings and plovers
Order: CharadriiformesFamily: Charadriidae

The family Charadriidae includes the plovers, dotterels, and lapwings. They are small to medium-sized birds with compact bodies, short thick necks, and long, usually pointed, wings. They are found in open country worldwide, mostly in habitats near water. Ten species have been recorded in Connecticut.

Northern lapwing, Vanellus vanellus (R)
Black-bellied plover, Pluvialis squatarola
American golden-plover, Pluvialis dominica
Pacific golden-plover, Pluvialis fulva (R)
Killdeer, Charadrius vociferus
Common ringed plover, Charadrius hiaticula (R) (S)
Semipalmated plover, Charadrius semipalmatus
Piping plover, Charadrius melodus
Wilson's plover, Charadrius wilsonia (R)
Snowy plover, Charadrius nivosus (R)

Sandpipers and allies

Order: CharadriiformesFamily: Scolopacidae

Scolopacidae is a large diverse family of small to medium-sized shorebirds including the sandpipers, curlews, godwits, shanks, tattlers, woodcocks, snipes, dowitchers, and phalaropes. The majority of these species eat small invertebrates picked out of the mud or soil. Different lengths of legs and bills enable multiple species to feed in the same habitat, particularly on the coast, without direct competition for food. Thirty-nine species have been recorded in Connecticut.

Upland sandpiper, Bartramia longicauda
Whimbrel, Numenius phaeopus
Eskimo curlew, Numenius borealis (X)
Long-billed curlew, Numenius americanus (R)
Bar-tailed godwit, Limosa lapponica (R)
Black-tailed godwit, Limosa limosa (R)
Hudsonian godwit, Limosa haemastica
Marbled godwit, Limosa fedoa
Ruddy turnstone, Arenaria interpres
Red knot, Calidris canutus
Ruff, Calidris pugnax (R)
Sharp-tailed sandpiper, Calidris acuminata (R)
Stilt sandpiper, Calidris himantopus
Curlew sandpiper, Calidris ferruginea (R)
Red-necked stint, Calidris ruficollis (R)
Sanderling, Calidris alba
Dunlin, Calidris alpina
Purple sandpiper, Calidris maritima
Baird's sandpiper, Calidris bairdii
Little stint, Calidris minuta (R) (S)
Least sandpiper, Calidris minutilla
White-rumped sandpiper, Calidris fuscicollis
Buff-breasted sandpiper, Calidris subruficollis
Pectoral sandpiper, Calidris melanotos
Semipalmated sandpiper, Calidris pusilla
Western sandpiper, Calidris mauri
Short-billed dowitcher, Limnodromus griseus
Long-billed dowitcher, Limnodromus scolopaceus
American woodcock, Scolopax minor
Wilson's snipe, Gallinago delicata
Spotted sandpiper, Actitis macularius
Solitary sandpiper, Tringa solitaria
Lesser yellowlegs, Tringa flavipes
Willet, Tringa semipalmata
Spotted redshank, Tringa erythropus (R)
Greater yellowlegs, Tringa melanoleuca
Wilson's phalarope, Phalaropus tricolor
Red-necked phalarope, Phalaropus lobatus
Red phalarope, Phalaropus fulicarius (R)

Skuas and jaegers

Order: CharadriiformesFamily: Stercorariidae

They are in general medium to large birds, typically with gray or brown plumage, often with white markings on the wings. They have longish bills with hooked tips and webbed feet with sharp claws. They look like large dark gulls, but have a fleshy cere above the upper mandible. They are strong, acrobatic fliers. Three species have been recorded in Connecticut.

Pomarine jaeger, Stercorarius pomarinus (R) (S)
Parasitic jaeger, Stercorarius parasiticus
Long-tailed jaeger, Stercorarius longicaudus (R)

Auks, murres, and puffins
Order: CharadriiformesFamily: Alcidae

Alcids are superficially similar to penguins due to their black-and-white colors, their upright posture, and some of their habits; however, they are only distantly related to the penguins and are able to fly. Auks live on the open sea, only deliberately coming ashore to nest. Six species have been recorded in Connecticut.

Dovekie, Alle alle (R)
Common murre, Uria aalge (R)
Thick-billed murre, Uria lomvia (R)
Razorbill, Alca torda
Black guillemot, Cepphus grylle (R)
Atlantic puffin, Fratercula arctica (R)

Gulls, terns, and skimmers

Order: CharadriiformesFamily: Laridae

Gulls are typically medium to large birds, usually gray or white, often with black markings on the head or wings. They have longish bills and webbed feet. The large species take up to four years to attain full adult plumage, but two years is typical for small gulls. Terns are in general medium to large birds, typically with gray or white plumage, often with black markings on the head. They have longish bills and webbed feet. They are lighter bodied and more streamlined than gulls, and look elegant in flight with long tails and long narrow wings. Skimmers are tropical and subtropical species. They have an elongated lower mandible. They feed by flying low over the water surface with the lower mandible skimming the water for small fish. Thirty-one Laridae species have been recorded in Connecticut.

Black-legged kittiwake, Rissa tridactyla (R)
Ivory gull, Pagophila eburnea (R) (S)
Sabine's gull, Xema sabini (R)
Bonaparte's gull, Chroicocephalus philadelphia
Black-headed gull, Chroicocephalus ridibundus
Little gull, Hydrocoloeus minutus (R)
Ross's gull, Rhodostethia rosea (R)
Laughing gull, Leucophaeus atricilla
Franklin's gull, Leucophaeus pipixcan (R)
Common gull, Larus canus (R)
Short-billed gull, Larus brachyrhynchus (R)
Ring-billed gull, Larus delawarensis
California gull, Larus californicus (R)
Herring gull, Larus argentatus
Iceland gull, Larus glaucoides
Lesser black-backed gull, Larus fuscus
Slaty-backed gull, Larus schistisagus (R)
Glaucous gull, Larus hyperboreus
Great black-backed gull, Larus marinus
Sooty tern, Onychoprion fuscata (R)
Bridled tern, Onychoprion anaethetus (R)
Least tern, Sternula antillarum
Gull-billed tern, Gelochelidon nilotica (R)
Caspian tern, Hydroprogne caspia
Black tern, Chlidonias niger
Roseate tern, Sterna dougallii
Common tern, Sterna hirundo
Arctic tern, Sterna paradisaea (R)
Forster's tern, Sterna forsteri
Royal tern, Thalasseus maxima
Sandwich tern, Thalasseus sandvicensis (R)
Black skimmer, Rynchops niger

Tropicbirds
Order: PhaethontiformesFamily: Phaethontidae

Tropicbirds are slender white birds of tropical oceans with exceptionally long central tail feathers. Their long wings have black markings, as does the head. One species has been recorded in Connecticut.

White-tailed tropicbird, Phaethon lepturus (R)

Loons

Order: GaviiformesFamily: Gaviidae

Loons are aquatic birds the size of a large duck, to which they are unrelated. Their plumage is largely gray or black, and they have spear-shaped bills. Loons swim well and fly adequately, but are almost hopeless on land, because their legs are placed towards the rear of the body. Three species have been recorded in Connecticut.

Red-throated loon, Gavia stellata — rather common, mostly along the coast and at the mouths of major rivers during spring and fall migration; uncommon in winter and at that time found mostly in eastern Long Island Sound; as many as 100 to 200 individuals gather together in November; many go south by early winter.
Pacific loon, Gavia pacifica (R)
Common loon, Gavia immer — historically, the bird rarely nests in Connecticut and no recent nesting was observed up to 2004 in the state; rather common in spring and fall during migration; found in coastal waters, large lakes, and reservoirs; most likely to be seen in eastern Long Island Sound; pollution (particularly acidified lakes which decrease food resources and increase mercury poisoning) has cut the population in the northeast, along with fluctuating reservoir levels and lakeshore residential development.

Southern storm-petrels

Order: ProcellariiformesFamily: Oceanitidae

The storm-petrels are the smallest seabirds, relatives of the petrels, feeding on planktonic crustaceans and small fish picked from the surface, typically while hovering. The flight is fluttering and sometimes bat-like. Until 2018, this family's three species were included with the other storm-petrels in family Hydrobatidae. Two species have been recorded in Connecticut.

Wilson's storm-petrel, Oceanites oceanicus — seen regularly in eastern Long Island Sound during the summer, but uncommon further west.
White-faced storm-petrel, Pelagodroma marina (R)

Northern storm-petrels

Order: ProcellariiformesFamily: Hydrobatidae

Though the members of this family are similar in many respects to the southern storm-petrels, including their general appearance and habits, there are enough genetic differences to warrant their placement in a separate family. Two species have been recorded in Connecticut.

Leach's storm-petrel, Hydrobates leucorhous (R)
Band-rumped storm-petrel, Hydrobates castro (R) (S)

Shearwaters and petrels

Order: ProcellariiformesFamily: Procellariidae

The procellariids are the main group of medium-sized "true petrels", characterized by united nostrils with medium septum and a long outer functional primary. Seven species have been recorded in Connecticut.

Northern fulmar, Fulmarus glacialis (R)
Black-capped petrel, Pterodroma hasitata (R)
Cory's shearwater, Calonectris diomedea (R)
Great shearwater, Ardenna gravis (R)
Sooty shearwater, Ardenna griseus (R)
Manx shearwater, Puffinus puffinus (R)
Audubon's shearwater, Puffinus lherminieri (R) (S)

Storks
Order: CiconiiformesFamily: Ciconiidae

Storks are large, heavy, long-legged, long-necked wading birds with long stout bills and wide wingspans. They lack the powder down that other wading birds such as herons, spoonbills and ibises use to clean off fish slime. Storks lack a pharynx and are mute. One species has been recorded in Connecticut.

Wood stork, Mycteria americana (R)

Frigatebirds
Order: SuliformesFamily: Fregatidae

Frigatebirds are large seabirds usually found over tropical oceans. They are large, black, or black-and-white, with long wings and deeply forked tails. The males have colored inflatable throat pouches. They do not swim or walk and cannot take off from a flat surface. Having the largest wingspan-to-body-weight ratio of any bird, they are essentially aerial, able to stay aloft for more than a week. One species has been recorded in Connecticut.

Magnificent frigatebird, Fregata magnificens (R)

Boobies and gannets
Order: SuliformesFamily: Sulidae

The sulids comprise the gannets and boobies. Both groups are medium-large coastal seabirds that plunge-dive for fish. Two species have been recorded in Connecticut.

Brown booby, Sula leucogaster (R)
Northern gannet, Morus bassanus — rarely found during spring and fall migration, and seldom seen in winter, although regularly present in December, mostly in eastern Long Island Sound.

Anhingas

Order: SuliformesFamily: Anhingidae

Anhingas are cormorant-like water birds with very long necks and long, straight beaks. They are fish eaters which often swim with only their neck above the water. One species has been recorded in Connecticut.

Anhinga, Anhinga anhinga (R)

Cormorants and shags
Order: SuliformesFamily: Phalacrocoracidae

Cormorants are medium-to-large aquatic birds, usually with mainly dark plumage and areas of colored skin on the face. The bill is long, thin and sharply hooked. Their feet are four-toed and webbed. Two species have been recorded in Connecticut.

Great cormorant, Phalacrocorax carbo — rather common along the coast from fall through spring, but also found on the Connecticut river and other large bodies of water.
Double-crested cormorant, Nannopterum auritum — now common from spring to fall, this bird was a rare migrant around 1900; much less common in winter, but sightings are increasing; mostly found on some coastal islands, but also on major rivers and some inland lakes; by the late 1990s, there were at least 1,000 nesting pairs in the state; these birds compete with fishermen and with less robust species, so efforts have been made in New York and southern New England to cut down the population; in the years leading up to 2004, the birds were less seen in the summer than previously.

Pelicans

Order: PelecaniformesFamily: Pelecanidae

Pelicans are very large water birds with a distinctive pouch under their beak. Like other birds in the order Pelecaniformes, they have four webbed toes. Two species have been recorded in Connecticut.

American white pelican, Pelecanus erythrorhynchos
Brown pelican, Pelecanus occidentalis (R)

Herons, egrets, and bitterns

Order: PelecaniformesFamily: Ardeidae

The family Ardeidae contains the herons, egrets, and bitterns. Herons and egrets are medium to large wading birds with long necks and legs. Bitterns tend to be shorter necked and more secretive. Members of Ardeidae fly with their necks retracted, unlike other long-necked birds such as storks, ibises, and spoonbills.egrets, including the great egret, were decimated in the past by plume hunters, but numbers recovered when given protection in the 20th century. Twelve species have been recorded in Connecticut.

American bittern, Botaurus lentiginosus — uncommon but widespread and found at any time of the year; mostly found in large marshes in summer or winter, and migrants may use small marshes; numbers likely declined when the common reed displaced cattail marshes
Least bittern, Ixobrychus exilis — rarely seen; found in spring through fall in large marshes; prefers marshes roughly equally mixed between vegetation and open water
Great blue heron, Ardea herodias — common in marshes and other bodies of water from spring through fall; numbers have been increasing in recent decades; increasingly seen in winter, but still uncommon then
Great egret, Ardea alba — rather common along the coast from spring through fall and rarely in early winter; less commonly found inland; groups of about 100 pairs nest on Great Captain Island off Greenwich, Charles Island off Milford, and Dyuck Island at Westbrook; numbers have been increasing
Little egret, Egretta garzetta (R)
Snowy egret, Egretta thula — rather common along the coast from spring through fall; can be found roosting at night with great egrets and cormorants; found in woody vegetation on coastal islands, including Great Captain Island, Charles Island, and Dyuck Island; the population on Long Island Sound (including New York state) declined a bit from 1,650 pairs in 1977 to 1,390 in 1998.
Little blue heron, Egretta caerulea — not common, seen from spring through early fall, but most often from mid- to late summer and early in the fall when young birds enter the state from the south; found nesting in woody areas of coastal islands, including Great Captain Island and Charles Island; the nesting range expanded to the north along the East Coast in the 20th century
Tricolored heron, Egretta tricolor — seldom found in the state; seen in coastal waters in the spring and summer, occasionally nested in the woody areas of the Norwalk Islands; in the mid 20th century the species became more abundant in New York and southern New England
Cattle egret, Bubulcus ibis — rarely seen; found in coastal waters in spring and summer; has been seen regularly nesting in the woody areas of the Norwalk Islands; a native of the Old World, the egret showed up in the 1880s, first in South America and by the 1940s had spread north to Florida and then along the East Coast
Green heron, Butorides virescens — rather common; found in marshes and swamps from spring through fall; loss of marshes and damage to them likely caused a decline in this population in the 20th century
Black-crowned night-heron, Nycticorax nycticorax — rather common on the coast and on the Connecticut river from spring through fall; rarely found in winter; spreads inland along the Connecticut and Housatonic Rivers in late summer; nests on coastal islands, including Great Captain Island, Charles Island, and Dyuck Island; the population in the state was about 500 pairs as of 2004; numbers declined in the Northeast United States in the 20th century, probably because of human disturbances and pesticide use; the Long Island Sound population (including New York state) declined from 2,400 pairs in 1977 to 1,390 in 1998
Yellow-crowned night-heron, Nyctanassa violacea— rarely seen; found in coastal marshes from spring through early fall, usually in the western part of the state

Ibises and spoonbills
Order: PelecaniformesFamily: Threskiornithidae

The family Threskiornithidae includes the ibises and spoonbills. They have long, broad wings. Their bodies tend to be elongated, the neck more so, with rather long legs. The bill is also long, decurved in the case of the ibises, straight and distinctively flattened in the spoonbills. Four species have been recorded in Connecticut.

White ibis, Eudocimus albus (R)
Glossy ibis, Plegadis falcinellus
White-faced ibis, Plegadis chihi
Roseate spoonbill, Platalea ajaja (R)

New World vultures

Order: CathartiformesFamily: Cathartidae

The New World vultures are not closely related to Old World vultures, but superficially resemble them because of convergent evolution. Like the Old World vultures, they are scavengers. However, unlike Old World vultures, which find carcasses by sight, New World vultures have a good sense of smell with which they locate carcasses. Two species have been recorded in Connecticut.

Black vulture, Coragyps atratus
Turkey vulture, Cathartes aura

Osprey
Order: AccipitriformesFamily: Pandionidae

The osprey is a medium-large fish-eating bird of prey or raptor. It is widely distributed because it tolerates a wide variety of habitats, nesting in any location which is near a body of water and provides an adequate food supply. It is the only member of its family.
Osprey, Pandion haliaetus — The distinctive black and white birds are common in the state from spring through fall; seen mostly on platforms on the east and central coastline; also called "fish hawks".
 migrations are heaviest in early to mid-spring (around St. Patrick's Day) and late summer through early fall (around Labor Day), with most juveniles migrating a bit later.
 feeds on medium-size fish, including flounders, which they catch by diving from the air, feet first; the birds are unique in Connecticut as the only species with a fish-only diet, and they are one of the few raptors that prey on live fish; they can be seen hovering over the water before splashing down, sometimes 2 or 3 feet in the water; the birds can catch up to 10 fish a day; adults feed their fledglings for up to 8 weeks; ospreys have been known to snatch goldfish from ornamental fish ponds.
 Formerly the bird was rare, in part due to pesticide contamination (including DDT), with just nine nests in the state as of 1974 and increasing to 162 (with 315 fledglings) by 1999; their range has expanded westward along the coast over time and up the Connecticut and Quinnipiac rivers; their nests stay intact through the winter, when the birds migrate as far as South America; in the 1990s, raccoon predation may have kept the population down at Great Island on the Connecticut river before barriers were put on the poles supporting nests; when raccoons were more scarce, ospreys successfully nested on the ground, but they typically build nests at the highest possible locations, including cell phone towers.
 In May 2008, the Maritime Aquarium at Norwalk set up a webcam of an osprey nest on Manressa Island, a peninsula on the west side of Norwalk Harbor, near a power plant. (A link to the webcam can be found at this Web page.) The tan color of the chicks makes them a bit difficult to see against the similarly colored nest on the black-and-white webcam feed. The aquarium monitors ospreys "because, as a predator, at the top of the food chain, osprey are an important indicator of the health of the entire ecosystem," according to the aquarium website.

Hawks, eagles, and kites

Order: AccipitriformesFamily: Accipitridae

Accipitridae is a family of birds of prey which includes hawks, eagles, kites, harriers, and Old World vultures. These birds have very large powerful hooked beaks for tearing flesh from their prey, strong legs, powerful talons, and keen eyesight. Fifteen species have been recorded in Connecticut.

White-tailed kite, Elanus leucurus (R)
Swallow-tailed kite, Elanoides forficatus
Golden eagle, Aquila chrysaetos
Northern harrier, Circus hudsonius
Sharp-shinned hawk, Accipiter striatus
Cooper's hawk, Accipiter cooperii
Northern goshawk, Accipiter gentilis
Bald eagle, Haliaeetus leucocephalus
Mississippi kite, Ictinia mississippiensis
Red-shouldered hawk, Buteo lineatus
Broad-winged hawk, Buteo platypterus
Swainson's hawk, Buteo swainsoni (R)
Zone-tailed hawk, Buteo albonotatus (R)
Red-tailed hawk, Buteo jamaicensis
Rough-legged hawk, Buteo lagopus

Barn-owls
Order: StrigiformesFamily: Tytonidae

Barn-owls are medium to large owls with large heads and characteristic heart-shaped faces. They have long strong legs with powerful talons. One species has been recorded in Connecticut.

Barn owl, Tyto alba

Owls

Order: StrigiformesFamily: Strigidae

Typical owls are small to large solitary nocturnal birds of prey. They have large forward-facing eyes and ears, a hawk-like beak, and a conspicuous circle of feathers around each eye called a facial disk. Eleven species have been recorded in Connecticut.

Eastern screech-owl, Megascops asio
Great horned owl, Bubo virginianus
Snowy owl, Bubo scandiacus
Northern hawk owl, Surnia ulula (R)
Burrowing owl, Athene cunicularia (R)
Barred owl, Strix varia
Great gray owl, Strix nebulosa (R)
Long-eared owl, Asio otus
Short-eared owl, Asio flammeus
Boreal owl, Aegolius funereus (R)
Northern saw-whet owl, Aegolius acadicus

Kingfishers
Order: CoraciiformesFamily: Alcedinidae

Kingfishers are medium-sized birds with large heads, long pointed bills, short legs, and stubby tails. One species has been recorded in Connecticut.

Belted kingfisher, Megaceryle alcyon

Woodpeckers

Order: PiciformesFamily: Picidae

Woodpeckers are small to medium-sized birds with chisel-like beaks, short legs, stiff tails, and long tongues used for capturing insects. Some species have feet with two toes pointing forward and two backward, while several species have only three toes. Many woodpeckers have the habit of tapping noisily on tree trunks with their beaks. Eight species have been recorded in Connecticut.

Red-headed woodpecker, Melanerpes erythrocephalus
Red-bellied woodpecker, Melanerpes carolinus
Yellow-bellied sapsucker, Sphyrapicus varius
Black-backed woodpecker, Picoides arcticus (R)
Downy woodpecker, Dryobates pubescens
Hairy woodpecker, Dryobates villosus
Northern flicker, Colaptes auratus
Pileated woodpecker, Dryocopus pileatus

Falcons and caracaras

Order: FalconiformesFamily: Falconidae

Falconidae is a family of diurnal birds of prey, notably the falcons and caracaras. They differ from hawks, eagles and kites in that they kill with their beaks instead of their talons. Five species have been recorded in Connecticut.

Crested caracara, Caracara plancus (R) — accepted by ARCC March 7, 2022
American kestrel, Falco sparverius
Merlin, Falco columbarius
Gyrfalcon, Falco rusticolus (R)
Peregrine falcon, Falco peregrinus

New World and African parrots
Order: PsittaciformesFamily: Psittacidae

Parrots are small to large birds with a characteristic curved beak. Their upper mandibles have slight mobility in the joint with the skull and they have a generally erect stance. All parrots are zygodactyl, having the four toes on each foot placed two at the front and two to the back. Most of the more than 150 species in this family are found in the New World. One species has been recorded in Connecticut.

Monk parakeet, Myiopsitta monachus (I)

Tyrant flycatchers

Order: PasseriformesFamily: Tyrannidae

Tyrant flycatchers are passerine birds which occur throughout North and South America. They superficially resemble the Old World flycatchers, but are more robust and have stronger bills. They do not have the sophisticated vocal capabilities of the songbirds. Most, but not all, are rather plain. As the name implies, most are insectivorous. Nineteen species have been recorded in Connecticut.

Ash-throated flycatcher, Myiarchus cinerascens (R)
Great crested flycatcher, Myiarchus crinitus
Tropical kingbird, Tyrannus melancholicus (R)
Western kingbird, Tyrannus verticalis
Eastern kingbird, Tyrannus tyrannus
Gray kingbird, Tyrannus dominicensis (R)
Scissor-tailed flycatcher, Tyrannus forficatus (R)
Fork-tailed flycatcher, Tyrannus savana (R)
Olive-sided flycatcher, Contopus cooperi
Eastern wood-pewee, Contopus virens
Yellow-bellied flycatcher, Empidonax flaviventris
Acadian flycatcher, Empidonax virescens
Alder flycatcher, Empidonax alnorum
Willow flycatcher, Empidonax traillii
Least flycatcher, Empidonax minimus
Gray flycatcher, Empidonax wrightii (R)
Pacific-slope flycatcher, Empidonax difficilis (R)
Eastern phoebe, Sayornis phoebe
Say's phoebe, Sayornis saya (R)

Vireos, shrike-babblers, and erpornis

Order: PasseriformesFamily: Vireonidae

The vireos are a group of small to medium-sized passerine birds. They are typically greenish in color and resemble the wood warblers except for their heavier bills. Seven species have been recorded in Connecticut.

White-eyed vireo, Vireo griseus
Bell's vireo, Vireo bellii (R)
Yellow-throated vireo, Vireo flavifrons
Blue-headed vireo, Vireo solitarius
Philadelphia vireo, Vireo philadelphicus
Warbling vireo, Vireo gilvus
Red-eyed vireo, Vireo olivaceus

Shrikes

Order: PasseriformesFamily: Laniidae

Shrikes are passerine birds known for their habit of catching other birds and small animals and impaling the uneaten portions of their bodies on thorns. A shrike's beak is hooked, like that of a typical bird of prey. Two species have been recorded in Connecticut.

Loggerhead shrike, Lanius ludovicianus (R) (E)
Northern shrike, Lanius borealis

Crows, jays, and magpies

Order: PasseriformesFamily: Corvidae

The family Corvidae includes crows, ravens, jays, choughs, magpies, treepies, nutcrackers, and ground jays. Corvids are above average in size among the Passeriformes, and some of the larger species show high levels of intelligence. Five species have been recorded in Connecticut.

Blue jay, Cyanocitta cristata
Eurasian jackdaw, Coloeus monedula (R)
American crow, Corvus brachyrhynchos
Fish crow, Corvus ossifragus
Common raven, Corvus corax

Tits, chickadees, and titmice
Order: PasseriformesFamily: Paridae

The Paridae are mainly small stocky woodland species with short stout bills. Some have crests. They are adaptable birds, with a mixed diet including seeds and insects. Three species have been recorded in Connecticut.

Black-capped chickadee, Poecile atricapilla
Boreal chickadee, Poecile hudsonicus (R)
Tufted titmouse, Baeolophus bicolor

Larks
Order: PasseriformesFamily: Alaudidae

Larks are small terrestrial birds with often extravagant songs and display flights. Most larks are fairly dull in appearance. Their food is insects and seeds. One species has been recorded in Connecticut.

Horned lark, Eremophila alpestris

Swallows

Order: PasseriformesFamily: Hirundinidae

The family Hirundinidae is adapted to aerial feeding. They have a slender streamlined body, long pointed wings and a short bill with a wide gape. The feet are adapted to perching rather than walking and the front toes are partially joined at the base. Eight species have been recorded in Connecticut.

Bank swallow, Riparia riparia
Tree swallow, Tachycineta bicolor
Northern rough-winged swallow, Stelgidopteryx serripennis
Brown-chested martin, Progne tapera (R) (S)
Purple martin, Progne subis
Barn swallow, Hirundo rustica
Cliff swallow, Petrochelidon pyrrhonota
Cave swallow, Petrochelidon fulva

Kinglets
Order: PasseriformesFamily: Regulidae

The kinglets are a family of birds which are very small insectivorous birds. The adults have colored crowns, giving rise to their name. Two species have been recorded in Connecticut.

Ruby-crowned kinglet, Corthylio calendula
Golden-crowned kinglet, Regulus satrapa

Waxwings
Order: PasseriformesFamily: Bombycillidae

The waxwings are a group of birds with soft silky plumage and unique red tips to some of the wing feathers. In the Bohemian and cedar waxwings, these tips look like sealing wax and give the group its name. These are arboreal birds of northern forests. They live on insects in summer and berries in winter. Two species have been recorded in Connecticut.

Bohemian waxwing, Bombycilla garrulus (R)
Cedar waxwing, Bombycilla cedrorum

Nuthatches
Order: PasseriformesFamily: Sittidae

Nuthatches are small woodland birds. They have the unusual ability to climb down trees head first, unlike other birds which can only go upwards. Nuthatches have big heads, short tails, and powerful bills and feet. Two species have been recorded in Connecticut.

Red-breasted nuthatch, Sitta canadensis
White-breasted nuthatch, Sitta carolinensis

Treecreepers
Order: PasseriformesFamily: Certhiidae

Treecreepers are small woodland birds, brown above and white below. They have thin pointed down-curved bills, which they use to extricate insects from bark. They have stiff tail feathers, like woodpeckers, which they use to support themselves on vertical trees. One species has been recorded in Connecticut.

Brown creeper, Certhia americana

Gnatcatchers
Order: PasseriformesFamily: Polioptilidae

These dainty birds resemble Old World warblers in their structure and habits, moving restlessly through foliage while seeking insects. The gnatcatchers are mainly a soft bluish gray in color and have the long sharp bill typical of an insectivore. Many species have distinctive black head patterns (especially males) and long, regularly cocked black-and-white tails. One species has been recorded in Connecticut.

Blue-gray gnatcatcher, Polioptila caerulea

Wrens

Order: PasseriformesFamily: Troglodytidae

Wrens are small and inconspicuous birds, except for their loud songs. They have short wings and thin down-turned bills. Several species often hold their tails upright. All are insectivorous. Five species have been recorded in Connecticut.

House wren, Troglodytes aedon
Winter wren, Troglodytes hiemalis
Sedge wren, Cistothorus platensis (R)
Marsh wren, Cistothorus palustris
Carolina wren, Thryothorus ludovicianus

Mockingbirds and thrashers

Order: PasseriformesFamily: Mimidae

The mimids are a family of passerine birds which includes thrashers, mockingbirds, tremblers, and the New World catbirds. These birds are notable for their vocalization, especially their remarkable ability to mimic a wide variety of birds and other sounds heard outdoors. The species tend towards dull grays and browns in their appearance. Three species have been recorded in Connecticut.

Gray catbird, Dumetella carolinensis
Brown thrasher, Toxostoma rufum
Northern mockingbird, Mimus polyglottos

Starlings

Order: PasseriformesFamily: Sturnidae

Starlings are small to medium-sized Old World passerine birds with strong feet. Their flight is strong and direct and most are very gregarious. Their preferred habitat is fairly open country, and they eat insects and fruit. The plumage of several species is dark with a metallic sheen. One species has been recorded in Connecticut.

European starling, Sturnus vulgaris (I)

Thrushes and allies

Order: PasseriformesFamily: Turdidae

The thrushes are a group of passerine birds that occur mainly but not exclusively in the Old World. They are plump, soft plumaged, small to medium-sized insectivores or sometimes omnivores, often feeding on the ground. Many have attractive songs. Twelve species have been recorded in Connecticut.

Eastern bluebird, Sialia sialis
Mountain bluebird, Sialia currucoides (R)
Townsend's solitaire, Myadestes townsendi (R)
Veery, Catharus fuscescens
Gray-cheeked thrush, Catharus minimus
Bicknell's thrush, Catharus bicknelli
Swainson's thrush, Catharus ustulatus
Hermit thrush, Catharus guttatus
Wood thrush, Hylocichla mustelina
Fieldfare, Turdus pilaris (R)
American robin, Turdus migratorius
Varied thrush, Ixoreus naevius (R)

Old World flycatchers
Order: PasseriformesFamily: Muscicapidae

The Old World flycatchers form a large family of small passerine birds. These are mainly small arboreal insectivores, many of which, as the name implies, take their prey on the wing. One species has been recorded in Connecticut.

Northern wheatear, Oenanthe oenanthe (R)

Old World sparrows
Order: PasseriformesFamily: Passeridae

Old World sparrows are small passerine birds. In general, sparrows tend to be small plump brownish or grayish birds with short tails and short powerful beaks. Sparrows are seed eaters, but they also consume small insects. Two species have been recorded in Connecticut.

House sparrow, Passer domesticus (I)
Eurasian tree sparrow, Passer montanus (I) (R) — accepted by ARCC March 7, 2022

Wagtails and pipits
Order: PasseriformesFamily: Motacillidae

Motacillidae is a family of small passerine birds with medium to long tails. They include the wagtails, longclaws, and pipits. They are slender ground-feeding insectivores of open country. Two species have been recorded in Connecticut.

American pipit, Anthus rubescens
Sprague's pipit, Anthus spragueii (R)

Finches, euphonias, and allies

Order: PasseriformesFamily: Fringillidae

Finches are seed-eating passerine birds that are small to moderately large and have a strong beak, usually conical and in some species very large. All have twelve tail feathers and nine primaries. These birds have a bouncing flight with alternating bouts of flapping and gliding on closed wings, and most sing well. Eleven species have been recorded in Connecticut.

Brambling, Fringilla montifringilla (R)
Evening grosbeak, Coccothraustes vespertinus
Pine grosbeak, Pinicola enucleator (R)
House finch, Haemorhous mexicanus
Purple finch, Haemorhous purpureus
Common redpoll, Acanthis flammea
Hoary redpoll, Acanthis hornemanni (R)
Red crossbill, Loxia curvirostra
White-winged crossbill, Loxia leucoptera
Pine siskin, Spinus pinus
American goldfinch, Spinus tristis

Longspurs and snow buntings
Order: PasseriformesFamily: Calcariidae

The Calcariidae are a group of passerine birds that had been traditionally grouped with the New World sparrows, but differ in a number of respects and are usually found in open grassy areas. Four species have been recorded in Connecticut.

Lapland longspur, Calcarius lapponicus
Chestnut-collared longspur, Calcarius ornatus (R)
Smith's longspur, Calcarius pictus (R)
Snow bunting, Plectrophenax nivalis

New World sparrows

Order: PasseriformesFamily: Passerellidae

Until 2017, these species were considered part of the family Emberizidae. Most of the species are known as sparrows, but these birds are not closely related to the Old World sparrows which are in the family Passeridae. Many of these have distinctive head patterns. Twenty-seven species have been recorded in Connecticut.

Grasshopper sparrow, Ammodramus savannarum
Lark sparrow, Chondestes grammacus
Lark bunting, Calamospiza melanocorys (R)
Chipping sparrow, Spizella passerina
Clay-colored sparrow, Spizella pallida
Field sparrow, Spizella pusilla
Brewer's sparrow, Spizella breweri (R)
Fox sparrow, Passerella iliaca
American tree sparrow, Spizelloides arborea
Dark-eyed junco, Junco hyemalis
White-crowned sparrow, Zonotrichia leucophrys
Golden-crowned sparrow, Zonotrichia atricapilla (R) (S)
Harris's sparrow, Zonotrichia querula (R)
White-throated sparrow, Zonotrichia albicollis
Vesper sparrow, Pooecetes gramineus
LeConte's sparrow, Ammospiza leconteii (R)
Seaside sparrow, Ammospiza maritima
Nelson's sparrow, Ammospiza nelsoni
Saltmarsh sparrow, Ammospiza caudacuta
Henslow's sparrow, Centronyx henslowii (R)
Savannah sparrow, Passerculus sandwichensis
Song sparrow, Melospiza melodia
Lincoln's sparrow, Melospiza lincolnii
Swamp sparrow, Melospiza georgiana
Green-tailed towhee, Pipilo chlorurus (R)
Spotted towhee, Pipilo maculatus (R)
Eastern towhee, Pipilo erythrophthalmus

Yellow-breasted chat
Order: PasseriformesFamily: Icteriidae

This species was historically placed in the wood-warblers (Parulidae) but nonetheless most authorities were unsure if it belonged there. It was placed in its own family in 2017.

Yellow-breasted chat, Icteria virens

Troupials and allies

Order: PasseriformesFamily: Icteridae

The icterids are a group of small to medium-sized, often colorful passerine birds restricted to the New World and include the grackles, New World blackbirds, and New World orioles. Most species have black as a predominant plumage color, often enlivened by yellow, orange, or red. Fourteen species have been recorded in Connecticut.

Yellow-headed blackbird, Xanthocephalus xanthocephalus
Bobolink, Dolichonyx oryzivorus
Eastern meadowlark, Sturnella magna
Western meadowlark, Sturnella neglecta (R)
Orchard oriole, Icterus spurius
Bullock's oriole, Icterus bullockii (R)
Baltimore oriole, Icterus galbula
Black-backed oriole, Icterus abeillei (R) (S)
Red-winged blackbird, Agelaius phoeniceus
Brown-headed cowbird, Molothrus ater
Rusty blackbird, Euphagus carolinus
Brewer's blackbird, Euphagus cyanocephalus (R) (S)
Common grackle, Quiscalus quiscula
Boat-tailed grackle, Quiscalus major

New World warblers

Order: PasseriformesFamily: Parulidae

The wood warblers are a group of small, often colorful passerine birds restricted to the New World. Most are arboreal, but some are more terrestrial, such as the Ovenbird. Most members of this family are insectivores. Forty species have been recorded in Connecticut.

Ovenbird, Seiurus aurocapilla
Worm-eating warbler, Helmitheros vermivorum
Louisiana waterthrush, Parkesia motacilla
Northern waterthrush, Parkesia noveboracensis
Golden-winged warbler, Vermivora chrysoptera
Blue-winged warbler, Vermivora cyanoptera
Black-and-white warbler, Mniotilta varia
Prothonotary warbler, Protonotaria citrea
Tennessee warbler, Leiothlypis peregrina
Orange-crowned warbler, Leiothlypis celata
Nashville warbler, Leiothlypis ruficapilla
Connecticut warbler, Oporornis agilis
MacGillivray's warbler, Geothlypis tolmiei (R) (S)
Mourning warbler, Geothlypis philadelphia
Kentucky warbler, Geothlypis formosa
Common yellowthroat, Geothlypis trichas
Hooded warbler, Setophaga citrina
American redstart, Setophaga ruticilla
Cape May warbler, Setophaga tigrina
Cerulean warbler, Setophaga cerulea
Northern parula, Setophaga americana
Magnolia warbler, Setophaga magnolia
Bay-breasted warbler, Setophaga castanea
Blackburnian warbler, Setophaga fusca
Yellow warbler, Setophaga petechia
Chestnut-sided warbler, Setophaga pensylvanica
Blackpoll warbler, Setophaga striata
Black-throated blue warbler, Setophaga caerulescens
Palm warbler, Setophaga palmarum
Pine warbler, Setophaga pinus
Yellow-rumped warbler, Setophaga coronata
Yellow-throated warbler, Setophaga dominica
Prairie warbler, Setophaga discolor
Black-throated gray warbler, Setophaga nigrescens (R)
Townsend's warbler, Setophaga townsendi (R)
Hermit warbler, Setophaga occidentalis (R)
Black-throated green warbler, Setophaga virens
Canada warbler, Cardellina canadensis
Wilson's warbler, Cardellina pusilla

Cardinals and allies

Order: PasseriformesFamily: Cardinalidae

The cardinals are a family of robust seed-eating birds with strong bills. They are typically associated with open woodland. The sexes usually have distinct plumages. Eleven species have been recorded in Connecticut.

Summer tanager, Piranga rubra
Scarlet tanager, Piranga olivacea
Western tanager, Piranga ludoviciana (R)
Northern cardinal, Cardinalis cardinalis
Rose-breasted grosbeak, Pheucticus ludovicianus
Black-headed grosbeak, Pheucticus melanocephalus (R)
Blue grosbeak, Passerina caerulea
Lazuli bunting, Passerina amoena (R)
Indigo bunting, Passerina cyanea
Painted bunting, Passerina ciris (R)
Dickcissel, Spiza americana

See also
Fauna of Connecticut
Flora of Connecticut
List of birds
List of mammals of Connecticut
List of birds of North America
Lists of birds by region
Long Island Sound for an extensive list of various species

Notes

References

Further reading
 Connecticut Birds (Zeranski and Baptist, 1990)
 The Atlas of Breeding birds of Connecticut (Bevier, 1994)
 The Connecticut Warbler, journal of the Connecticut Ornithological Association

Connecticut
Birds